Galloway Run is a small stream located in Easton Maryland.

References

Rivers of Maryland
Tributaries of the Chesapeake Bay